The Boezembrug is a bridge in Rotterdam, part of the Gouda Roadway. The Bosom bridge connects both banks of the Boezem. The bridge is a Rijksmonument designed by S. J. Rutgers in 1903.

Concrete bridges in the Netherlands
Road bridges in the Netherlands
Bridges in Rotterdam
Rijksmonuments in Rotterdam